Bernard Jourdain (born August 16, 1950 in Brussels) is a Belgian born Mexican racing driver. Jourdain is the uncle of racer Michel Jourdain Jr., and a pivotal figure in Michel Jr.’s progression from novice to Champ Car race winner. Now retired from racing, Bernard runs a restaurant in California, as well as other business projects.

Racing career

Open Wheel Racing

Although Jourdain had been racing professionally since 1969, he did not appear on the international scene until late 1987, when he raced twice in Formula Atlantic. Despite crashing in both these races, he gained a drive with Cimarran Racing for the following season in Formula Super Vee USA Robert Bosch/Valvoline Championship. In his first full season, racing internationally in USA, he scored two major race victories by winning the Dallas Grand Prix and St. Petersburg GTE Grand Prix. This helped him to finish third in the overall standing. Also during the ’88 season, Jourdain made his CART debut. He signed with Andale Racing to race their March-Cosworth 86C in the last two races of the year. Broken suspension stopped him in his debut at Laguna Seca, he returned for the Miami Indy Challenge, where finished sixth.

He remained with Andale for the 1989, with the team upgrading the car to a Lola-Cosworth T89/00. It was with Andale that he made the first of his two Indianapolis 500s starts. After finishing nine laps down in ninth place, he was named the Indy 500 Co-Rookie of the Year along with Scott Pruett. He would only score one more top 10 finish, taking tenth in the Molson Indy Toronto. At the end of the season, he finished 18th in the overall standing, and was awarded the CART Rookie of the Year title.

In 1990 Jourdain returned to Andale for the Indianapolis 500. During qualifying, he wrecked his Lola-Buick T89/00, and was forced to try and qualify the spare car, a Lola-Buick T88/00. It was in this car; he ricocheted off three walls and demolished it, seriously injuring himself in the process. He underwent surgery to remove his spleen. He returned to open-wheeled racing the following season, securing a drive with A. J. Foyt Enterprises, and became the first non-US-born driver to race for four-time Indianapolis 500 winner A. J. Foyt, starting in the Toyota Long Beach Grand Prix. He raced once more with Foyt, in the Indy 500, but did not finish either of these races due to gearbox gremlins. After the race at Indianapolis, Jourdain retired from international motor sport.

Sports Car Racing

1988 also was Jourdain make his international race debut in sport cars in the SunBank 24 at Daytona with Kalagian Racing. After finishing fifth, he would continue to race Kalagian’s Porsche 962 in a number of Camel GT Championship, alongside his Formula Super Vee commitments. When in 1989, he step up into CART, he cut back his sport cars racing to just another visit to the SunBank 24 at Daytona, with an outing in the works Spice Engineering team when the FIA World Sports Prototype Championship visited the Autódromo Hermanos Rodríguez in Mexico City.

He returned to the Camel GT Championship in 1990, with the Spice Engineering USA team, finishing on the third step on the podium in the Camel Grand Prix of Heartland Park, prior to his big Indy crash. He would return to racing in time for the 480km of Mexico City with Team Davey in their Porsche 962C.

It was October 2005, when after a break of 14 years away from the track, he dusted down his crash helmet and raced in round of the Campeonato de España de GT. He continued into 2006, with Lozano Motorsport/Estudio 2000 sa, in their Porsche 996 GT3-RSR, alongside Manuel Sáez-Merino Jr. in a selection of International GT Open race, archiving two tenth places finishes.

Racing record

Career highlights

Complete 24 Hours of Daytona results

Complete 12 Hours of Sebring results

American Open Wheel racing results
(key)

Formula Super Vee

CART

Indianapolis 500

References

1950 births
Living people
Mexican racing drivers
Champ Car drivers
Indianapolis 500 drivers
Indianapolis 500 Rookies of the Year
Mexican people of Belgian descent
Mexican Indianapolis 500 drivers
World Sportscar Championship drivers
24 Hours of Daytona drivers
12 Hours of Sebring drivers
IMSA GT Championship drivers
Atlantic Championship drivers
SCCA Formula Super Vee drivers
Racing drivers from Brussels
A. J. Foyt Enterprises drivers